Vos or VOS may refer to:

Language 
 VOS, Verb–object–subject, in linguistic typology
 v.o.s., a Czech company designator similar to Inc./LLP/LLC
 VOS, a denominación de origen classification for sherries aged more than 20 years
 Vos (Spanish), a second person singular pronoun used in place of tú in some countries
Vos, formal second person pronoun, see T–V distinction

People 
 Vos (surname), a Dutch surname meaning "fox", and a list of people with that name

Media and entertainment 
 Vintage Original Spec, a type of Gibson Les Paul Custom guitar
 Vos, a 2003 album by Leo García
 V.O.S (band), a South Korean boy band
 Vos (Danish band)
 Voice of the Strait, a Chinese radio station

Science and technology 
 Virtual Operating System, a type of Virtual Machine 
 Hitachi VOS, a mainframe computer operating system by Hitachi Data Systems
 Stratus VOS, a fault-tolerant computer operating system developed by Stratus
 Virtual Object System, computer software primarily used for multiuser 3D virtual reality applications
 Veritas Operations Services, a web-based suite of services
 Voluntary observing ship program, a system for weather reporting from the ocean surface
 Volatile organic solvents

See also 
 Mirari Vos, a papal encyclical issued by Gregory XVI